Tachygerrini is a tribe of water striders containing 21 species in 2 genera. In addition to the two extant genera, Eurygerris and Tachygerris, Andersen included the extinct genus Eurygerris within the Tachygerrini.

Genera
 Eurygerris
 Tachygerris

References

Gerrinae
Hemiptera tribes